Iais is a genus of isopod crustaceans. Iais species are found in association with larger isopods of the family Sphaeromatidae, usually on the ventral surface of the larger animal, between the pereiopods and on the pleopods. They are native to Australasia and South America, although Iais californica and its host Sphaeroma quoyanum have invaded California, and I. californica was first described from Sausalito, California. Nine species are recognised:
Iais aquilei Coineau, 1977
Iais californica (H. Richardson, 1904)
Iais chilensis (Winkler, 1992)
Iais elongata Sivertsen & Holthuis, 1980
Iais floridana Kensley & Schotte, 1999
Iais pubescens (Dana, 1853)
Iais singaporensis Menzies & Barnard, 1951
Iais solangae Coineau, 1985

References

Asellota